Haggai Hoberman (b. 24 Nisan 1959) is an Israeli journalist and author.

Biography
Haggai Hoberman grew up in Haifa. He served in the Nahal brigade in Kfar Etzion. Subsequent to completing his army service, he worked as a welder in the Amgazit factory. In 1984, he moved to Netzarim  for three years and then to  Bnei Darom.

Journalism career
He began his journalistic career at Zra'im, a Bnei Akiva newspaper. Later, he served as  night editor at HaTzofe. He was the paper's settlement affairs correspondent for fourteen years. 

In 2007, after  HaTzofe was bought out, he became the military affairs correspondent for Makor Rishon.

Published works
Eretz Moledet (1994): (lit. Homeland) Touring Israel through its past, pub. Bet El Publishing 
 Yichudo shel Kfar (2003): (lit. Uniqueness of the Village) the story of Kfar Haroeh 
 Shorashim Becholot (2005): (lit. Roots in the Sand) the story of Gush Katif from its beginning to the end 
 Keneged Kol HaSikuim (2008): (lit. Against all Odds) 40 years of settlement in Yesha, pub. Netzarim Publishing

References

1959 births
Living people
Israeli journalists
People from Haifa